Alan Dawa Dolma (born on 25 July 1987), known professionally as Alan, is a Tibetan singer and she is known for her signature "Tibetan wail", often incorporated into her music. She is a graduate of the PLA Academy of Art, majoring in vocal music and erhu, which she has played since childhood.

During her time in college, Alan released a cover album titled Shengsheng Zui Rulan (2005). In early 2006, she auditioned for Japanese label Avex Trax and was subsequently signed as their first Tibetan artist. In late 2007, Alan moved to Tokyo and made her debut with "Ashita e no Sanka". She recorded the theme song to the film Red Cliff (2008), which brought wide exposure and is featured on her debut Japanese studio album, Voice of Earth (2009).

In 2009, her ninth single "Kuon no Kawa" debuted at number three on the Oricon weekly charts, the highest placement by a singer from China. Her second Japanese studio album, My Life, came that same year. Following a slew of singles in 2010, including the Inuyasha: The Final Act ending theme "Diamond", Alan released the greatest hits album Japan Premium Best and began concentrating on promotional activities in China, where she has solely been active since. Her third Chinese album, Love Song, was released in 2012.

Biography

1987–2002: Early life
Alan was born on July 25, 1987, in Kangding, Sichuan, to Atu, a local government official, and Lantai, a singer. A large family; her father had ten siblings and her mother had eight. She grew up with her grandparents in nearby Danba, often referred to as "Beauty Valley". Her native language is Rgyal rong, one of the Qiangic languages, while the speakers are designated as Tibetan.

As Tibetan culture traditionally makes no use of family names, she was born as simply Dawa Dolma, bestowed upon her by a Buddhist monk and meaning "heavenly maiden of the moon" in Tibetan. She later adopted a family name for practical reasons, with "Alan" born from a portmanteau of her parents' given names, Atu and Lantai.

Alan was made to play the erhu at an early age as a punishment for her tomboy behavior. Her mother moved the two of them to the capital, Chengdu, where her aunt lived and where Alan began attending the Sichuan Conservatory of Music, after ranking first in the erhu audition as a fourth grader.

2003–2006: Career beginnings
In 2003, she was accepted to the PLA Academy of Art in Beijing and double-majored in vocal music and erhu. Playing the erhu, she performed traditional Chinese music with a group of girls at the 2006 gala performance near Cairo, which celebrated the 50th anniversary of the establishment of Chinese–Egyptian diplomatic ties.

During this time, Alan performed as a singer throughout China and discovered pop music from acts such as Faye Wong, Jacky Cheung and Andy Lau. In 2005, she released her first Chinese album, Shengsheng Zui Rulan, covering thirteen songs by more established C-pop singers, which helped reduce her student debt burden to her parents.

In October 2006, selected to represent mainland China together with Vision Wei (with whom she later collaborated for the single "Jiayou! Ni You Me!"), Alan won second place at the 9th Asia New Singer Competition, narrowly losing to Filipina singer Maria Donna Taneo by 0.005 points.

2007–2010: Voice of Earth, My Life and Japan Premium Best and More
In April 2006, Alan distinguished herself from roughly 40,000 hopefuls when Avex Trax held auditions throughout Chinese cities that year. After graduating with excellence a year later, she became Avex's first signed artist from China and moved to Tokyo, Japan in September 2007. In November 2007, her first Japanese single "Ashita e no Sanka" was released.

In May 2008, Alan released Shiawase no Kane/Ai Jiushi Shou and all profits from the songs were donated to the Red Cross to help the victims of the Sichuan earthquake in her home province. A later Japanese single titled Gunjō no Tani was also dedicated to the people of Sichuan.

In June 2008, Alan sang the theme song "Natsukashii Mirai (Longing Future)" for NHK's Save the Future special TV programs which raised awareness of the environment nationwide. Beginning with this song, which was themed on earth, Alan's next five Japanese singles each dealt with a traditional Buddhist element from the Japanese Godai or Tibetan Bön.

Chosen to sing the theme songs (Xin Zhan: Red Cliff and Chibi: Da Jiangdong Qu) of the two-episode Chinese blockbuster Red Cliff, Alan performed at the Cannes Film Festival in May 2008. The Japanese versions, "Red Cliff (Shin-Sen)" and "Kuon no Kawa", were recorded for the films' showings in Japan.

In April 2009 Alan's ninth single "Kuon no Kawa" [River of Eternity] reached No. 3, the highest chart placement ever for a Chinese artist in Japan.

Alan held her first Japan tour in January 2010, taking in Tokyo, Nagoya and Osaka.

On 3 February 2010, Alan released a double A-side single, "Diamond/Over the Clouds". "Diamond" was used as the second closing to the anime Inuyasha: The Final Act. While "Over the Clouds" was used as the theme song for the PSP video game, God Eater.

On 23 July 2010 Alan performed with a symphonic orchestra at Shibuya Orchard Hall, performing 23 songs in multiple languages. She also began using Twitter to communicate directly with fans.

2011–2013: Hiatus in Japan, return to China, and Love Song
In August 2011 alan announced that she will be focusing on her activities in China. She held a live on 31 August 2011 in Japan. In October was announced that alan's Chinese label, Avex China, dissolved and she was transferred to Yuehua Music.

Her first single under the new label called "Wǒ huíláile (I'm back)" was released as digital single in China, Taiwan and Hong Kong and was composed by JJ Lin.

Alan starred as the female lead, the "Crystal Goddess", in the 21 September "Bird Nest- Attraction" musical.

In June 2012, Alan released her first Chinese album under Yuehua Music, Love Song, which includes 10 new songs produced by some famous C-pop producer like Anson Hu and Yuan Wei Jen, and a Japanese version of the album's title song.

In 2013, Alan auditioned for the Chinese version of popular TV Show The X-Factor Zhongguo Zui Qiang Yin.  When asked of the reason of joining a singing competition show, Alan expressed her disapproval of being known as the singer of theme songs to films and television serials such as Red Cliff, Inuyasha and Bu Bu Jing Xin, and decided to have a "new start" to her singing career. Alan past the auditions, however she was eliminated before reaching the final twelve due to her judge Lo Ta-yu's critiquing on Alan's inability to reach high notes and that she wasn't suitable for the competition. Her elimination was deemed controversial due to additional footage displaying Alan's ability to reach her high notes.

Alan has also provided her voice to sing the theme song of Chinese Martial Arts MMORPG Wen Jian. The song is named The Sword Between Heaven and Earth (天地問劍).

2014–present: New releases and return to Japan
On 24 May 2014 Alan held her first concert in Japan since 2011.

July 2014 marked the release of her fourth Chinese studio album Mo Lan, which includes five previously released digital singles: "Huí Wàng", "Sùmìng Héngzhe Xiě", "Ài Wèi Zǒu Yuǎn", "Tiān Dì Wèn Jiàn" and "Home".

In August 2014, she officially announced a year-end concert entitled Alan symphony that would take place on 20 December that year in Tokyo.

On 20 December 2014, Alan held two "Alan Symphony 2014" concerts in Nippon-Seinenkan (日本青年館), Tokyo, Japan. One concert started at 15:00 and the other at 19:00.

Artistry
In addition to Mandarin Chinese and Japanese, Alan also sings in Tibetan, especially in her native Kham Ke (e.g. "Sign" from her "Hitotsu" single, and "Tennyo: Interlude" from Voice of Earth). One distinctive singing style of Alan's is the so-called "Tibetan wail", where she is able to stretch her vocals for a long period of time at very high notes. She has said her singing style is instinctive and is unique to her tribe. Alan had no prior experience in singing until entering university.

In addition to erhu, Alan can also play the piano. She composed "Together" from Voice of Earth (2009), and is credited as co-composer on a majority of the songs from My Life (2009).

As a Tibetan Buddhist, Alan aims to sing about "love and peace".

Discography

Japanese discography
Studio albums
 2009: Voice of Earth
 2009: My Life

Compilation albums
 2011: Japan Premium Best & More
 2022: The Best of alan 2007-2022 (Digital)

Chinese discography
Studio albums
 2005: Shengsheng Zui Rulan (声声醉如兰)
 2009: Xin De Dongfang (心的東方)
 2012: Love Song
 2014: Mo Lan (驀蘭)
 2017: Shi Nian (十念)

EPs
 2008: Xin Zhan: Red Cliff (心・战)
 2010: Lan Se: Love Moon Light (蘭色)
 2021: I Want To Love You So Much (我想好好愛你)

Filmography 
 《我的双面女友》(2012)
 《粉红女郎·爱人快跑》(2013)
 The Rise of a Tomboy (2016)
 《热血江湖之梦幻奇缘》(2017)

References

External links 

Official Website (Japan)

1987 births
Avex Group artists
Chinese sopranos
Japanese-language singers of China
Chinese expatriates in Japan
Living people
Chinese Mandopop singers
People from Garze
Tibetan Buddhists from China
21st-century Tibetan women singers
Musicians from Sichuan
Erhu players
Chinese pianists
Tibetan-language singers
Performers of Buddhist music
21st-century Chinese women singers
21st-century pianists
21st-century women pianists